Naraporn Chan-o-cha (née Rotchanachan; born 20 June 1954) is a Thai educator. She was an associate professor at the Faculty of Arts of Chulalongkorn University. She is the wife of Prayut Chan-o-cha, the 29th prime minister of Thailand.

Early life and education 
Naraporn was born on 20 June 1954. She is the daughter of Police Brigadier General Chamrat Rotchanachan, a policeman and governor from Narathiwat Province and Suthin Rotchanachan. She attended classes at Saint Joseph Convent School. Later on, she graduated with a bachelor's degree from the Faculty of Liberal Arts at Thammasat University and a master's degree in English teaching from the Faculty of Science at Mahidol University.

Career 
Until 2010, Naraporn worked as an associate professor at Chulalongkorn University's Language Institute. She became the president of Organization of English Teachers in Thailand and vice chairman of the Distance Learning Foundation, where she took up a guest lecturer position. She also worked for the Foundation for the Blind after leaving Chulalongkorn.

When her husband, Prayut, became the Commander-in-Chief of the Royal Thai Army, she served as the president of the Thai Army Wives Association.

Personal life 
Naraporn is married since 22 June 1984 to Prayut Chan-o-cha, whom she met while teaching English at Chulalongkorn University. They have twin daughters named Tanya and Nittha.

Honours 
 : Knight Grand Cordon of the Order of the Crown of Thailand (2004)
 : Chakrabarti Mala Medal (2005)
 : Knight Grand Cordon of the Order of the White Elephant (2010)

References 

1954 births
Living people
Naraporn Chan-o-cha
Naraporn Chan-o-cha
Naraporn Chan-o-cha
Naraporn Chan-o-cha